Barbro Christina Hedvall, (born February 8, 1944 in Bromma) is a Swedish journalist. She was an editorial writer for Dagens Nyheter between 1999 until 2009, and before that she was an editorial writer for Expressen for nineteen years. Hedvall is frequently a guest at the SVT morning show and along with Göran Greider  she has written a book called Stil och politik about political fashion.

Bibliography
1975 – Kvinnan i politiken, 
2011 – Vår rättmätiga plats: om kvinnornas kamp för rösträtt ,

References

Living people
1944 births
20th-century Swedish journalists
Journalists from Stockholm
20th-century Swedish women writers